The 1889 Chicago White Stockings season was the 18th season of the Chicago White Stockings franchise, the 14th in the National League, and the 5th at the first West Side Park. The White Stockings finished third in the National League with a record of 67–65.

Regular season

Season standings

Record vs. opponents

Roster

Player stats

Batting

Starters by position 
Note: Pos = Position; G = Games played; AB = At bats; H = Hits; Avg. = Batting average; HR = Home runs; RBI = Runs batted in

Other batters 
Note: G = Games played; AB = At bats; H = Hits; Avg. = Batting average; HR = Home runs; RBI = Runs batted in

Pitching

Starting pitchers 
Note: G = Games pitched; IP = Innings pitched; W = Wins; L = Losses; ERA = Earned run average; SO = Strikeouts

Relief pitchers 
Note: G = Games pitched; W = Wins; L = Losses; SV = Saves; ERA = Earned run average; SO = Strikeouts

References 
1889 Chicago White Stockings season at Baseball Reference

Chicago Cubs seasons
Chicago White Stockings season
Chicago White Stockings